VCF may refer to:

Organizations
 Valencia CF, a Spanish professional football club in Valencia
 Victory (church) (formerly VCF), an evangelical Protestant church based in the Philippines
 Vietnam Children's Fund, a non-profit organization based in Unionville, Virginia, United States

Technology
 Variant Call Format, the format of a text file used in bioinformatics for storing gene sequence variations
 vCard, a file format standard for electronic business cards
 Virtual Case File, a software application developed by the United States Federal Bureau of Investigation
 Visual Component Framework, an abandoned open source project for development under Microsoft Windows and Apple Macintosh
 VMware Cloud Foundation, an infrastructure platform for hybrid cloud management of the VMware Infrastructure product line
 Voltage-controlled filter, an electronic filter whose operating characteristics can be set by an input control voltage
 Volume correction factor, a standardized computed factor used to correct for the thermal expansion of fluids

Other
 September 11th Victim Compensation Fund, an act of the US Congress to compensate the victims of the September 11 attacks
 VCF, one of several brands of spermicide
 Vintage Computer Festival, an international event celebrating the history of computing

See also
VFC (disambiguation)